Leon Mettam (born 9 December 1986) is an English footballer, primarily a striker, who is presently player-manager at Wisbech Town. He played in the Football League for Lincoln City.

Playing career

Gainsborough Trinity
In July 2010, Mettam left The Steelmen to join league rivals Gainsborough Trinity.

Worksop Town
Mettam then went on to join ambitious Worksop Town, who were managed by his former Lincoln City youth team coach, Simon Clark.

Tamworth
On 10 June 2014, Mettam, and his Worksop Town teammate Shane Clarke joined Conference North side Tamworth.
Following an ankle injury in October 2014 which kept him sidelined for the remainder of the year, Mettam joined Northern Premier League side King's Lynn Town on a month's loan in January 2015, scoring three times in five appearances.

King's Lynn Town
After being released by Tamworth at the end of the 2015/16 season; Mettam was unveiled to King's Lynn Town's supporters at a pre-season fans' forum on 7 June 2016 on a two-year contract.
In June 2018 he joined Spalding United on a permanent basis.
In May 2020, he was appointed player-coach at Skegness Town.

Frickley Athletic
In April 2021, Mettam was appointed player-assistant manager at West Yorkshire side Frickley Athletic, being reunited with former boss Dave Frecklington.

Wisbech Town
In July 2022, Mettam was appointed player-manager at United Counties League Premier Division club Wisbech Town.

Career statistics

References

External links

1986 births
Living people
People from Lincoln, England
English footballers
Association football forwards
Lincoln City F.C. players
Stamford A.F.C. players
Corby Town F.C. players
Gainsborough Trinity F.C. players
Worksop Town F.C. players
Tamworth F.C. players
King's Lynn Town F.C. players
Spalding United F.C. players
Skegness Town A.F.C. players
Frickley Athletic F.C. players
Wisbech Town F.C. players
English Football League players
National League (English football) players
Northern Premier League players
Southern Football League players
Wisbech Town F.C. managers